Marino Keith (born 16 December 1974) is a Scottish former footballer who played as a forward. Born in Peterhead, he played in the Scottish Highland Football League for Fraserbugh FC, in the English Football League for Plymouth Argyle and Colchester United, and in the Scottish Football League for Dundee United FC, Falkirk FC, Livingston FC, and Peterhead FC. His older brother, Paul, was a prolific goalscorer with Fraserburgh FC in the Scottish Highland Football League, and where he spent his entire football career.

Early life and career
Keith was born in Peterhead, Aberdeenshire. A product of the Scottish Highland Football League, he began his professional football career with Fraserburgh FC in the Scottish Highland Football League, where he played for five years. He was bought by Dundee United in 1995 for a £35,000 fee. After making four substitute appearances in two years, he was transferred to Falkirk in 1997 for £40,000, where he scored 28 league goals in 71 appearances. Next, Keith joined Livingston, who had just been promoted to the Scottish First Division, where he made 21 appearances and scored 7 times. Two years later, he moved on to Plymouth Argyle in England, where he would make over 100 appearances. Four years and thirty league goals later, Keith joined Colchester United and played in the remaining 12 games of the 2004-05 season. He scored at Peterborough in his second appearance and added three more goals as Colchester finished the season undefeated in the same 12 matches. Picking up an achilles injury in pre-season 2005, Keith suffered several setbacks in his rehabilitation. Colchester stood by the player but he announced his retirement from full-time football on 8 March 2007. In the summer of 2007, Keith moved back to Scotland to play part-time for his hometown club Peterhead in Scottish Football League Division Two, Peterhead having just been promoted from the Scottish Highland Football League a few seasons earlier.

Career statistics

Honours
Falkirk
Scottish Challenge Cup: 1997

Plymouth Argyle
Football League Third Division: 2001–02
Football League Second Division: 2003–04

References

External links

1974 births
Living people
People from Peterhead
Footballers from Aberdeenshire
Scottish footballers
Association football forwards
Fraserburgh F.C. players
Dundee United F.C. players
Falkirk F.C. players
Livingston F.C. players
Plymouth Argyle F.C. players
Colchester United F.C. players
Peterhead F.C. players
Scottish Football League players
English Football League players